The  'Nak'waxda'xw, also known as the Nakoaktok, are an Indigenous nation, a part of the Kwakwaka'wakw, in the Central Coast region of British Columbia, on northern Vancouver Island. 

In 1964, they were relocated by government officials from their ancient village Ba'as at Blunden Harbour (on the mainland side of the Queen Charlotte Strait) to their current main village at Port Hardy. 

The Indian Act First Nations government of this nation is called Gwa'sala-'Nakwaxda'xw Nations, and includes the Gwa'sala people, who were traditionally a separate group, from the area of Smith Sound.

See also 
 Kwakwaka'wakw

External links 
 U'mista Cultural Society - Alert Bay

Kwakwaka'wakw